Claudia Anne Kolb (born December 19, 1949), also known by her married name Claudia Thomas, is an American former competition swimmer, two-time Olympic champion, and former world record-holder in four events.

Kolb represented the United States as a 14-year-old at the 1964 Summer Olympics in Tokyo, Japan.  She competed in the women's 200-meter breaststroke, and received the silver medal for her second-place performance (2:47.6) behind Soviet Galina Prozumenshchikova, who set a new Olympic record (2:46.4).

When Mexico City hosted the 1968 Summer Olympics, Kolb won two gold medals.  She dominated her competition in the medley events, winning both the women's 200-meter individual medley (2:24.7) and women's 400-meter individual medley (5:08.5).  Kolb set new Olympic records in both events in the preliminary heats and the event finals.

During her career. Kolb won 25 U.S. national AAU Championships and set 23 world records.  In 1967 she was named "World Swimmer of the Year" by Swimming World magazine.  In 1975 she was inducted into the International Swimming Hall of Fame.

Kolb retired from competitive swimming after the Mexico City Olympics.  She has coached swimming at clubs in South Bend, Indiana and Santa Clara, California, and college teams at Stanford University and at Pacific University.  Her Stanford swimmers won the 1980 AIAW national team championship.

She lives in Oregon.

See also

 List of Olympic medalists in swimming (women)
 World record progression 100 metres breaststroke
 World record progression 200 metres individual medley
 World record progression 400 metres individual medley
 World record progression 4 × 100 metres medley relay

References

External links

Image of U.S. Olympic swimmers Cathy Ferguson, Sharon Stouder and Claudia Kolb at LA Swim Stadium, California, 1964. Los Angeles Times Photographic Archive (Collection 1429). UCLA Library Special Collections, Charles E. Young Research Library, University of California, Los Angeles.

1949 births
Living people
American female breaststroke swimmers
American female medley swimmers
American swimming coaches
Pacific Tigers swimming coaches
World record setters in swimming
Olympic gold medalists for the United States in swimming
Olympic silver medalists for the United States in swimming
People from Hayward, California
Sportspeople from California
Stanford Cardinal swimming coaches
Swimmers at the 1964 Summer Olympics
Swimmers at the 1967 Pan American Games
Swimmers at the 1968 Summer Olympics
Medalists at the 1968 Summer Olympics
Medalists at the 1964 Summer Olympics
Pan American Games gold medalists for the United States
Pan American Games medalists in swimming
Medalists at the 1967 Pan American Games
20th-century American women